Thomas A. Muldoon (27 July 1897 – 12 October 1989) was an Irish footballer who played for, among others, Athlone Town and Aston Villa. As an international he also played for the Irish Free State and represented them at the 1924 Olympic Games.

Early years

Muldoon initially attended Deer Park National School in Athlone before completing his education, between 1912 and 1914, at St. Mary's Intermediate School. During the First World War he joined the Prince of Wales's Leinster Regiment and subsequently served in British India.

Club career

After the War, Muldoon began playing football for Athlone Town. In 1924 he helped them win the FAI Cup, beating Bohemians and Shelbourne in early rounds, before defeating Fordsons in final. Together with Dinny Hannon, Frank Ghent, Paddy Reilly and John Joe Dykes, Muldoon was one of five Athlone Town players subsequently included in the Irish Free State squad for the 1924 Olympic Games.

In October 1924 Muldoon signed for Aston Villa and went on to make 34 first team appearances during his three-year stay. In September 1927 he moved to Tottenham Hotspur but failed to make the first XI. In July 1929 he returned to the Midlands where he played over 50 league games for Walsall.

Irish international

Between 1924 and 1927 Muldoon made 5 appearances for the Irish Free State. As a member of the squad that competed at the 1924 Olympic Games, he made his debut for the Free State against Bulgaria in their first ever senior international on 28 May. At the same tournament he also played against the Netherlands on 2 June.
 Then on the following day, Muldoon played against Estonia in a friendly. 

On 14 June 1924 he played in another friendly against the United States in a 3–1 win at Dalymount Park.
 His last international appearance was in the 2–1 defeat to Italy B on 23 April 1927. Together with Mick O'Brien, Harry Duggan and Joe Kendrick, he became one of the first four English League based players to play for the Irish Free State.
. Muldoon was injured during the game and finished it as a limping passenger.

Honours

Athlone Town

FAI Cup
Winners 1924: 1

References

External links

 Irish Free State stats

1897 births
1989 deaths
Republic of Ireland association footballers
Irish Free State international footballers
League of Ireland players
Olympic footballers of Ireland
Footballers at the 1924 Summer Olympics
Athlone Town A.F.C. players
Aston Villa F.C. players
Tottenham Hotspur F.C. players
Walsall F.C. players
Prince of Wales's Leinster Regiment soldiers
British Army personnel of World War I
People from Athlone
Sportspeople from County Westmeath
Irish soldiers in the British Army
Irish Free State association footballers
Association football midfielders